The Sysen Dam is a rock-fill embankment dam in the municipality of Eidfjord in Hordaland, Norway.

The dam holds back Lake Sysen, which is the main reservoir for the Sy-Sima Hydroelectric Power Station. The average annual production of the power station is 1,115 GWh.

The water supply to Vøring Falls is regulated by the dam, and there is a requirement for minimum water supply during the summer season.

The dam is a tourist attraction, and it can be accessed from Norwegian National Road 7.

References

External links
 The Sysen Dam at the Norwegian Water Resources and Energy Directorate

Dams in Norway
Eidfjord